José Eduardo Campos Barahona (born March 15, 1983 in Usulután, El Salvador) is a Salvadoran footballer who currently plays as a midfielder for Luis Ángel Firpo  in the Primera División de Fútbol de El Salvador.

Club career
Campos started his career in the youth section at Santa Clara and after a spell at Topiltzín, he joined Luis Ángel Firpo in 2000. He joined Vista Hermosa in 2005 only to return to Firpo a year later.

International career
Campos made his debut for El Salvador in an August 2007 friendly match against Honduras, coming on as a second-half substitute for one of the goalscorers of the match, Victor Merino. The score stood in a victory for the Cuscatlecos by 2–0, although Campos was yellow-carded. His second and last international cap was in a September 2007 friendly match against Ecuador, where he came in as a second-half substitute for Julio Enrique Martínez. At the 62nd minute of the Ecuador game José Eduardo Campos swept forcefully on an Ecuadorian player and Peruan referee red-carded Campos; the second of the match for the Salvaoran team. The match was won by Ecuador by a score of 5–1.

References

External links

1983 births
Living people
People from Usulután Department
Association football midfielders
Salvadoran footballers
El Salvador international footballers
C.D. Luis Ángel Firpo footballers
C.D. Vista Hermosa footballers